Robert Gandt (born December 15, 1939) is an American author and aviator.

Gandt has written and published more than a dozen books on military and aviation history and military adventure fiction.

Biography 

Gandt was born in Springfield, Missouri, and raised in nearby Coffeyville, Kansas. At age twenty he was the youngest aviator and officer then on active duty in the U. S. Navy. After accumulating over 300 carrier landings and nearly 2000 hours in the A-4 Skyhawk,
he joined Pan American World Airways as an airline pilot in 1965. With the sale of Pan Am's Atlantic routes in 1991, he transferred to Delta Air Lines as a captain and check airman. In 1985, Gandt was a founder and team member of the Redhawk Formation Aerobatic Team, flying SIAI-Marchetti SF.260 military trainers in precision formation aerobatic routines.
Gandt's writing career began in the mid-1970s when he was based in Hong Kong. Season of Storms: The Siege of Hong Kong 1941, was drawn from the newspaper series he produced for the South China Morning Post.  His subsequent works were derived from his own experience and connections to military and aviation figures. Gandt's naval aviation chronicle Bogeys and Bandits (Viking, 1997) was adapted for the CBS series Pensacola: Wings of Gold, for which Gandt worked as a writer and technical consultant. The first of his novels, With Hostile Intent, was published by Penguin Group in 2001. With co-author Bill White and with a foreword by Senator John McCain, Gandt wrote Intrepid: The Epic Story of America's Most Legendary Warship (Random House, 2009), which won the Admiral Farragut Book Award. His multi-viewpoint account of the World War II battle for Okinawa, The Twilight Warriors (Random house, 2010) was the winner of the Samuel Eliot Morison Award for Naval Literature.
Gandt’s best-selling book Angels in the Sky (W.W. Norton, 2017) recounts the saga of the volunteer airmen who fought in Israel’s 1948 war of independence. He is a graduate of Charter Oak State College with a B.A in History. He is a member and contributor to The Tailhook Association, The Authors Guild, Mensa International, the Experimental Aircraft Association, Quiet Birdmen and the Naval Order of the United States. Gandt holds a black belt in Shaolin Kempo Karate.

Works

Non-fiction 

 Season of Storms: The Siege of Hong Hong 1941 (SCMP Press, 1981) ASIN BooooEDW4G
 China Clipper: The Age of the Great Flying Boats (Naval Institute Press, 1991/2010) 
 Skygods: The Fall of Pan Am (Wm. Morrow, 1995/2012) 
 Bogeys and Bandits: The Making of a Fighter Pilot (Viking, 1997) 
 Fly Low, Fly Fast: Inside the Reno Air Races (Viking, 1999) 
 Intrepid: The Epic Story of America's Most Legendary Warship (Broadway/Random House, 2008) 
 The Twilight Warriors: The Deadliest Naval Battle of WWII and the Men Who Fought It  (Broadway/Random House 2010)  
 Mastery: A Mission Plan for Reclaiming a life of Purpose, Fitness, and Achievement  (Dominus Press, 2015) 
 Angels in the Sky: How a Band of Volunteer Airmen Saved the New State of Israel (WW Norton, 2017)

Novels 

 The President's Pilot (Black Star Press, 2014) 
 With Hostile Intent (Signet, 2001) 
 Acts of Vengeance (Signet, 2002) 
 Black Star (Signet, 2003) 
 Shadows of War (Signet, 2005) 
 The Killing Sky (Signet, 2006) 
 Black Star Rising (Signet, 2007)

Screen Credits 

 "Boom," Pensacola: Wings of Gold (CBS TV Series) 1998.
 "Blue Angel," Pensacola: Wings of Gold, 1998.
 "Rules of Engagement," Pensacola: Wings of Gold, 1999.
 Technical consultant, Season 2, Pensacola: Wings of Gold, 1998–99.
 "Chasing Reno Gold," air racing documentary as writer, host, consultant, 2012.

Awards 

Samuel Eliot Morison Award for Naval Literature, 2011, for The Twilight Warriors.
Admiral Farragut Book Award, 2009, with co-author Bill White for Intrepid.

In the Media 

Commentator on Fox News' "Fox & Friends" television segment titled "Fall to Earth": a discussion about Pan American Airlines.
Commentator in the BBC Documentary Airline: The Story of Pan Am, titled , BBC.
Guest expert speaker in the PBS television series "They made America: Gamblers," discussing Pan Am founder Juan Trippe.
Commentator in documentary "On the Wings of Giants," on Pan Am.
Guest speaker in PBS documentary series "Chasing the Sun," on the history of commercial aviation.
Lecturer, Embry Riddle University President's Series, February 27, 2012.
Commentator on the three-part PBS series “Across the Pacific,” about Pan Am’s historic flying boat era.

References

External links 
 Gandt.com Official Site
 Amazon.com author's page
 Crown Publishing Group Press Release
 U.S Naval Institute Catalogue
 Random House, Inc., Authors, Robert Gandt

1939 births
Living people
20th-century American novelists
American male novelists
American military writers
United States Navy officers
American naval historians
Historians of World War II
United States Naval Aviators
Aviators from Florida
Mensans
Charter Oak State College alumni
Commercial aviators
American male non-fiction writers
20th-century American male writers